Leslie Lewis (born February 13, 1955) is a former American marathon runner.

She won the Athens Classic Marathon in 1989 with her personal best of 2:37:42 and competed in 1990 Goodwill Games and the 1995 Catalina Marathon.

References

External links 
 Profile at ARRS

American female marathon runners
1955 births
Living people
Place of birth missing (living people)
Competitors at the 1990 Goodwill Games
21st-century American women